John Carroll (born Julian La Faye; July 17, 1906 – April 24, 1979) was an American actor.

Career
Carroll was born in New Orleans, Louisiana. He performed in several small roles in films under his birth name until 1935, when he first used the name John Carroll in Hi, Gaucho!. He appeared in several Western films in the 1930s, including the role of Zorro in Zorro Rides Again in 1937. He was the male lead in the Marx Brothers' Western comedy Go West in 1940. Probably his best known role was as Woody Jason in the 1942 movie Flying Tigers with John Wayne. He was also notable as a Cajun soldier, aptly nicknamed Wolf, in the 1945 comedy A Letter for Evie.

He interrupted his movie career during World War II and served as a U.S. Army Air Corps pilot in North Africa. He broke his back in a crash. He recovered and resumed his acting career.

John Carroll was a well-established actor and his wife Lucille was a casting director at Metro-Goldwyn-Mayer (MGM). In 1948, the fledgling  movie actress Marilyn Monroe moved into their house. They helped support her emotionally and financially during her difficult transition period. Their support was essential in her success as an actress.

Carroll worked steadily through the mid-1950s, but his career began to fade in the latter half of the decade. He did play a memorable role in the 1957 Budd Boetticher western Decision at Sundown as Tate Kimbrough, the evil nemesis of Randolph Scott's character. His last roles were in Ride in a Pink Car in 1974 and in Orson Welles' The Other Side of the Wind, released in 2018, that he joined in 1975.

Personal life
Carroll was married twice; first to Steffi Duna (the couple had a daughter, Julianna Benito), and then to Lucille Ryman (until his death).

Carroll died of leukemia at the age of 72 in Hollywood, California. He was buried in Forest Lawn Memorial Park, Hollywood Hills, California.

Partial filmography

Marianne (1929) - Doughboy (uncredited)
Devil-May-Care (1929) - Bonapartist (uncredited)
The Rogue Song (1930) - Bandit (uncredited)
Monte Carlo (1930) - Wedding Guest Officer (uncredited)
Doughboys (1930) - Doughboy in Elmer's Squad (uncredited)
New Moon (1930) - Russian Soldier on Ship (uncredited)
Hi, Gaucho! (1935) - Lucio Bolario
Muss 'em Up (1936) - Gene Leland
Murder on a Bridle Path (1936) - Latigo Wells
The Accusing Finger (1936) - Dominic (uncredited)
Death in the Air (1936) - Jerry Blackwood
We Who Are About to Die (1937) - Joe Donahue
Zorro Rides Again (1937, Serial) - James Vega
Rose of the Rio Grande (1938) - El Gato
Swingtime in the Movies (1938) - Rick Arden (short film)
I Am a Criminal (1938) - Brad McArthur
Only Angels Have Wings (1939) - Gent Shelton
Wolf Call (1939) - Michael 'Mike' Vance
Congo Maisie (1940) - Dr. Michael Shane
Susan and God (1940) - Clyde
Phantom Raiders (1940) - John Ramsell, Jr
Hired Wife (1940) - Jose de Briganza
Go West (1940) - Terry Turner
Sunny (1941) - Larry Warren
This Woman is Mine (1941) - Ovide de Montigny
Lady Be Good (1941) - Buddy Crawford
Rio Rita (1942) - Ricardo Montera
Pierre of the Plains (1942) - Pierre
Flying Tigers (1942) - Woody Jason
The Youngest Profession (1943) - Dr. Hercules
Hit Parade of 1943 (1943) - Rick Farrell
Bedside Manner (1945) - Morgan Hale
A Letter for Evie (1946) - Edgar 'Wolf' Larson
Fiesta (1947) - Jose 'Pepe' Ortega
Wyoming (1947) - Glenn Forrester
The Fabulous Texan (1947) - John Wesley Baker
The Flame (1947) - George MacAllister
Old Los Angeles (1948) - Johnny Morrell
I, Jane Doe (1948) - Stephen Curtis
Angel in Exile (1948) - Charlie Dakin
The Avengers (1950) - Don Careless / Francisco Suarez
Surrender (1950) - Gregg Delaney
Hit Parade of 1951 (1950) - Joe Blake / Eddie Paul
Belle Le Grand (1951) - John Kilton
The Farmer Takes a Wife (1953) - Jotham Klore
Geraldine (1953) - Grant Sanborn
Reluctant Bride (1955) - Jeff Longstreet
Decision at Sundown (1957) - Tate Kimbrough
Plunderers of Painted Flats (1959) - Clint Jones
Ride in a Pink Car (1974) - Mr. Henry
The Other Side of the Wind (2018) - Lou Martin (final film role)

References

External links

1906 births
1979 deaths
American male film actors
Deaths from cancer in California
Deaths from leukemia
Male actors from New Orleans
Burials at Forest Lawn Memorial Park (Hollywood Hills)
20th-century American male actors